Per Skau (born 22 May 1968) is a former Danish professional darts player.

Career

At the 1992 Embassy World Championship, Skau defeated Dave Whitcombe in the first round 3–1 only to be knocked out by eventual champion Phil Taylor 3–1 in the second. He repeated this performance in 1996, beating Eric Burden in the first round but losing in the second round to Colin Monk. He also reached the quarterfinals of the 1991 Winmau World Masters, beating Les Delderfield and Mike Gregory before losing to American Dave Kelly.

Skau also won a number of open tournaments, winning the Finnish Open in 1991, the Swedish Open and the Swiss Open in 1993 and the German Open in 1994. It was during the 1993 Swiss Open where Skau hit a perfect nine-dart leg.

In 2009, Skau made a comeback – reaching the final of JFM Championships, losing to Per Laursen

Another visit to the oche, was made in 2013 – Skau played the Danish National Championships, which he won. Repeating his victories for almost 20 years ago, a feat he did repeat in 2016 and 2017 – Skau participated in some of the Scandinavian PDC events, just nearly missing out on one of the 2 World Championship spots.

World Championship Results

BDO

 1991: 1st Round (lost to Dave Whitcombe 1–3)
 1992: 2nd Round (lost to Phil Taylor 1–3)
 1993: 1st Round (lost to Eric Bristow 1–3)
 1994: 1st Round (lost to Martin Adams 0–3)
 1995: 1st Round (lost to Paul Hogan 1–3)
 1996: 2nd Round (lost to Colin Monk 2–3)

Trivia

During his first round match at the 1993 Embassy World Championship against Eric Bristow, Skau won the first 4 legs of the match, and when Bristow won the fifth leg, Skau was nearly head-butted by Bristow. Skau won just 3 more legs after that as Bristow cruised to a 3–1 in sets victory.

References

External links
Profile and stats on Darts Database

Danish darts players
Living people
British Darts Organisation players
Professional Darts Corporation associate players
1968 births
PDC World Cup of Darts Danish team
Sportspeople from the Capital Region of Denmark